The China University of Political Science and Law (CUPL) is a public research university established in 1952 in Beijing, China. It is the No. 1 political science and law university in China and within the top 10 worldwide. It has a strong emphasis on the research and teaching of law, politics, economics, management, sociology, history, and philosophy.

CUPL is a top tier institution included in the nation's Double First Class University Plan, former Project 211, Project 985 Innovative Platforms for Key Disciplines as part of the national endeavor to build world-class universities. Evaluated by the Ministry of Education, it achieved the highest status "A+" in legal studies. It is also one of the most selective universities to enter through China's National College Entrance Exam. The university consistently features in the top 10 global universities in "Law and Legal Studies" as ranked by the QS World University Rankings by Subjects.

CUPL has two campuses, one in Haidian District as the original campus of the university, and the other located in Changping District. At present, Haidian campus only conducts postgraduate education while undergraduates study on the larger Changping campus. In 2015, CUPL comprises 13 schools, with 15,833 students and 951 faculty members, of whom 290 are professors. CUPL maintains a broad international exchange program, with approximately 1000 foreign students from many countries.

History

CUPL was initially established in 1952, with its name as the Beijing College of Political Science and Law, incorporating departments of law, political science, and sociology of Peking University, Yenching University, Fu Jen Catholic University, and Tsinghua University. The prestigious scholar Ch'ien Tuan-Sheng, who was educated at Harvard University and regarded as the founder of modern political science in China, was appointed as the first president. But after the outbreak of Cultural Revolution, CUPL was greatly affected. CUPL had been stopped during Cultural Revolution. Ch'ien died of illness in 1990.

In 1983, under the policy of Central People's Government to develop the college quickly and make it the center of politics and law education in China, BCPSL was renamed as the China University of Political Science and Law. The Changping campus was a part of the State's Seventh Five-Year-Plan in 1985.

Under the motto of "Cherish the Moral, Understand the Law, Know the World, Serve the Public"; CUPL made its contribution to the development of legal education and training in China. It was the first university to establish specialties such as Legal History, Civil and Commercial Law, Economic Law, Procedure Law and Comparative Law in the PRC. It also contributed to the education and promotion of Roman law in China. With over 100,000 graduates in the past 50 years who have become the elites of law enforcement and practitioners in China, CUPL has developed a niche for the enactment and enforcement of law in China. Furthermore, it became prominent in other public affairs in China, among which members of the faculty and student body played an active role in the Tiananmen Square protests of 1989 demanding democracy and rule of law.

To face the challenge of globalization, CUPL developed joint programs with international partners. CUPL provided the first opportunity to study Chinese law in Beijing with an American Bar Association-approved program inaugurated in 1995 by the Duquesne University School of Law. In 2008, an exchange program was formed with Fordham University School of Law.

CUPL also maintains relationship with the University of Exeter and the University of Oxford in England, Deakin University in Australia, the University of Pennsylvania, Georgetown University, Washington University in St. Louis, the UIUC, the University of California, Berkeley, the University of California, Davis in the United States, the University of Montreal in Canada, and National University of Singapore Faculty of Law in Singapore.

Postgraduate programs
CUPL also offers two LLM programs and a PhD program for international students in English. One of them is based in Changping and is with the China-EU University. This is an EU funded course, and its main focus is on educating Chinese students on EU law.

There is another LLM program at Haidian campus, in downtown Beijing, which is aimed at International students to learn about Chinese law. There is also a PhD programs in English at Haidian campus. These are flexible and taught entirely in English. They include the option to study Mandarin, and gain law work experience in Beijing and other cities in China.

These postgraduate programs are also open as a semester program to international students from any institution around the world who would like to study at CUPL for one semester.

Chinese language programs
There are Chinese language programs for international students.

Campuses
It has one campus in Haidian District (Xueyuan Lu Campus) and one in Changping District (Changping Campus).

Schools
Law School
Civil, Commercial and Economic Law School
School of International Law
School of Criminal Justice
School of Political Science and Public Administration
School of Business
School of Humanities
School of Juris Master
School of Foreign Languages
School of Continuing Education
School of International Studies
Department of Science and Technology Teaching
Department of Physical Education
School of Sociology
China-EU School of Law (CESL)
School of Marxism
International Confucian Academy
Guangming School of Journalism and Communication
MBA Education Center
MPA Education Center

China-EU Law School

List of rectors
Qian Duansheng: August 1952—1958
 Cao Haibo: March 1979—December 1982
Liu Fuzhi: February 1983—December 1984
Zou Yu: December 1984—June 1988
Jiang Ping: June 1988—February 1990
Chen Guangzhong: May 1992—March 1994
Yang Yonglin: March 1994—September 2001
Xu Xianming: September 2001—February 2009
Huang Jin: February 2009—May 2019
Ma Huaide: May 2019—present

References

External links
China University of Political Science and Law's English website

 
Law schools in China
Universities and colleges in Beijing
Changping District
Educational institutions established in 1952
1952 establishments in China
Universities and colleges in Haidian District
Political science education
Political science in China
Plan 111
Winners of the Nikkei Asia Prize